In Food and Allied Workers Union and Another v The Cold Chain, an important case in South African labour law, the Labour Court held that there was nothing absurd in permitting a senior managerial employee to participate in the activities of a trade union, provided that the employee complies with his contractual obligations. In this case, the employee was offered a managerial position as an alternative to retrenchment, on condition that he no longer participated in the activities of the trade union. When he refused, he was retrenched. The court did not hesitate to find the dismissal to be automatically unfair.

See also 
 South African labour law

References 
 FAWU & Another v The Cold Chain [2007] 7 BLLR 638 (LC).

Notes 

2007 in South African law
2007 in case law
South African labour case law
Labour Court of South Africa cases